The Senior men's race at the 1992 IAAF World Cross Country Championships was held in Boston, Massachusetts, United States, at the Franklin Park on March 21, 1992.   A report on the event was given in The New York Times.

Complete results, medallists, 
 and the results of British athletes were published.

Race results

Senior men's race (12.53 km)

Individual

Teams

Note: Athletes in parentheses did not score for the team result

Participation
An unofficial count yields the participation of 233 athletes from 46 countries in the Senior men's race.  This is in agreement with the official numbers as published.

 (1)
 (5)
 (9)
 (6)
 (2)
 (8)
 (2)
 (9)
 (2)
 (1)
 (7)
 (1)
 (1)
 (2)
 (1)
 (9)
 (7)
 (4)
 (9)
 (9)
 (1)
 (6)
 (6)
 (9)
 (1)
 (9)
 (6)
 (6)
 (7)
 (2)
 (3)
 (6)
 (9)
 (7)
 (1)
 (2)
 (2)
 (9)
 (1)
 (9)
 (5)
 (6)
 (9)
 (9)
 (1)
 (6)

See also
 1992 IAAF World Cross Country Championships – Junior men's race
 1992 IAAF World Cross Country Championships – Senior women's race
 1992 IAAF World Cross Country Championships – Junior women's race

References

IAAF World Cross Country Championships
Senior men's race at the World Athletics Cross Country Championships